Simon Hamilton (born 17 March 1977) is a former Unionist politician from Northern Ireland representing the Democratic Unionist Party (DUP).  Hamilton was a Member of the Northern Ireland Assembly (MLA) for  Strangford from 2007 to 2019; Hamilton also served as the Economy Minister in the Northern Ireland Executive from 2016 until its collapse in January 2017.

Education
Hamilton was educated at Regent House School and Queen's University, Belfast holding degrees in history/politics and law. He served as Chairman of the Queen's Unionist Association and as a member of Queen's University Senate.

Career
Hamilton began his career as an auditor with an accountancy firm in Belfast and was employed as a DUP Policy Officer in their Party Headquarters from 2003 until his election to the Northern Ireland Assembly in 2007. He was elected to Ards Borough Council in 2005 but did not stand at the 2011 Election. Hamilton is secretary of Strangford DUP Association and vice-chairman of Newtownards DUP Branch.

He was appointed minister of finance and personnel and replaced Sammy Wilson on 29 June 2013 in a reshuffle.

He was later appointed as the Health Minister of Northern Ireland in a further DUP reshuffle on 11 May 2015. He resigned from this post several times during September and October 2015 in the context of a political crisis at Stormont.

In June 2019, Hamilton announced he was standing down from front line politics to become CEO of Belfast Chamber of Commerce. He also resigned from the DUP to take this role.

References

1977 births
Living people
People from Newtownards
Alumni of Queen's University Belfast
Democratic Unionist Party MLAs
Northern Ireland MLAs 2007–2011
Northern Ireland MLAs 2011–2016
Northern Ireland MLAs 2016–2017
Northern Ireland MLAs 2017–2022
Ministers of the Northern Ireland Executive (since 1999)
Members of Ards Borough Council
Ministers of Finance and Personnel of Northern Ireland